Interstate 695 (I-695) was an auxiliary Interstate Highway that was proposed in 1964 to connect I-95 in Southwest Philadelphia, at Philadelphia International Airport, with I-95 near the Delaware River waterfront near the Benjamin Franklin Bridge. Known as the Cobbs Creek Expressway between Southwest Philadelphia and I-76 and the Crosstown Expressway between I-76 and the waterfront, I-695 was designed to provide connections to Philadelphia International Airport and become part of a Center City Loop, with the Crosstown Expressway being the southern section of that loop (the Schuylkill Expressway was going to be the west section, the Vine Street Expressway as the north, and the Delaware Expressway as the east section).

Route description
I-695 was to begin at I-95 near Philadelphia International Airport in Philadelphia. The freeway would head north to the east of Darby Creek, crossing into Delaware County near 84th Street. The road would cross Cobbs Creek and continue to the west of the creek, passing through Colwyn and Yeadon before passing near Mount Moriah Cemetery. I-695 would cross back into Philadelphia and turn east, running through West Philadelphia. The freeway would cross the Schuylkill River and intersect with the Schuylkill Expressway (I-76, previously I-676) near exit 346B. The Cobbs Creek Expressway would end and the Crosstown Expressway would begin, following Grays Avenue up to South Street, where the route would borrow the cut-and-cover design (which is used on the Vine Street and Delaware expressways) between the South Street/Bainbridge Street corridor, before ending at an intersection with I-95 (near the current exit 20).

History
I-695 was first proposed in 1964. The project to build I-695 was canceled due to residential opposition in both Southwest Philadelphia, South Philadelphia, and residents of Yeadon, in Delaware County over the proposed Interstate's right-of-way, which would have cut their communities in half, and would have spelled an end to Cobbs Creek Park. The money slated for construction of I-695 went to the purchase of buses and trains for SEPTA, and for the construction of the Airport Line connecting Amtrak's Northeast Corridor with Philadelphia International Airport.

Exit list
Exits were going to be located at these locations:

See also

References

External links

I-695 on Kurumi.com
Pennsylvania Highways: I-695
The Roads of Metro Philadelphia: Cobbs Creek Expressway (I-695) (unbuilt)
The Roads of Metro Philadelphia: Crosstown Expressway (I-695) (unbuilt)
I-95 Construction in Center City Philadelphia on Pennways.com

95-6 (Pennsylvania)
95-6
95-6
6 (Pennsylvania)
95-6 (Pennsylvania)
Transportation in Philadelphia
Transportation in Delaware County, Pennsylvania